The 32nd annual Berlin International Film Festival was held from 12–23 February 1982. The Golden Bear was awarded to the West German film Veronika Voss directed by Rainer Werner Fassbinder.

The Honorary Golden Bear (Goldener Ehrenbär) was introduced for the first time in this edition to pay tribute to important figures in the world of film. The award has been presented for an exceptional artistic career and is given to the guest of honour of the Homage. In this edition it was awarded to American actor James Stewart.

A new section was introduced at the festival by Manfred Salzgeber, which was renamed Panorama in 1986. The retrospective dedicated to German film director Curtis Bernhardt titled Insurrection of Emotions along with East German children’s films of the 50-70s in collaboration with the DEFA.

Jury

The following people were announced as being on the jury for the festival:
 Joan Fontaine, actress (United States) - Jury President
 Vladimir Baskakov, filmmaker, writer and politician (Soviet Union)
 Brigitte Fossey, actress (France)
 Joe Hembus, film critic and film historian (West Germany)
 László Lugossy, director (Hungary)
 Gian Luigi Rondi, film critic (Italy)
 Helma Sanders-Brahms, director, screenwriter and producer (West Germany)
 Mrinal Sen, director, screenwriter and producer (India)
 David Stratton, film critic and film historian (Australia)

Films in competition
The following films were in competition for the Golden Bear award:

Out of competition
 Butterfly, directed by Matt Cimber (USA)
 Coup de Torchon, directed by Bertrand Tavernier (France)
 Whose Life Is It Anyway?, directed by John Badham (USA)
 Feine Gesellschaft - beschränkte Haftung, directed by Ottokar Runze (West Germany)
 Großstadtzigeuner, directed by Irmgard von zur Mühlen (West Germany)
 Kraftprobe, directed by Heidi Genée (West Germany)
 Liebeskonzil, directed by Werner Schroeter (West Germany)
 Mille milliards de dollars, directed by Henri Verneuil (France)

Key
{| class="wikitable" width="550" colspan="1"
| style="background:#FFDEAD;" align="center"| †
|Winner of the main award for best film in its section
|}

Retrospective and Homage
The following films were shown in the retrospective "Insurrection of Emotions: Curtis Bernhardt":

The following films were shown in the retrospective "East German Children’s Films": 

The following films were shown in the homage to James Stewart:
 

The film Berlin: Die Sinfonie der Großstadt by Walter Ruttmann was also shown in the retrospective.

Awards
The following prizes were awarded by the Jury:
 Golden Bear: Veronika Voss by Rainer Werner Fassbinder
 Silver Bear – Special Jury Prize: Dreszcze by Wojciech Marczewski
 Silver Bear for Best Director: Mario Monicelli for Il Marchese del Grillo
 Silver Bear for Best Actress: Katrin Saß for Bürgschaft für ein Jahr
 Silver Bear for Best Actor: 
 Michel Piccoli for Une étrange affaire
 Stellan Skarsgård for Den Enfaldige Mördaren
 Silver Bear for an outstanding single achievement: Zoltán Fábri for Requiem
 Honourable Mention:
 Muzhiki!
 Absence of Malice
 The Killing of Angel Street
 Golden Bear – Honorary Award: James Stewart
FIPRESCI Award
Dreszcze by Wojciech Marczewski

References

External links
32nd Berlin International Film Festival 1982
1982 Berlin International Film Festival
Berlin International Film Festival:1982 at Internet Movie Database

32
1982 film festivals
1982 in West Germany
1980s in West Berlin
Berlin